An internal focus lens (sometimes known as  IF) is a photographic lens design in which focus is shifted by moving the inner lens group or groups only, without any rotation or shifting of the front lens element. This makes it easy to use, for example, a screwed-in polarizing filter or a petal shaped lens hood. During macro photography, using an internal focus lens reduces the risk of the front of the lens accidentally hitting the subject during focusing as the front element does not move.

The physical size of an internal focusing lens does not change during focus, nor does the front of the lens rotate. This is particularly useful for large lenses, keeping the size more compact, or when using filters or accessories mounted on the front of the lens that may require careful alignment.
One issue internal focusing lens can have is that the true focal length of the lens is reduced when not focused at infinity.

See also
 Breathing (lens)

References

Photographic lenses